Oorukku Uzhaippavan is a 1976 Indian Tamil-language film written and directed by M. Krishnan Nair, starring M. G. Ramachandran, Vanisri and Venniradai Nirmala. It is a remake of the 1970 Kannada film Baalu Belagithu. The film was released on 12 November 1976.

Plot 
Selvam, a secret agent, takes the place of a rich industrialist, Raja. The operation is facilitated because both men look alike. Indeed, a gang rages in the region and swindles the wealthy citizens like Raja. The mission of Selvam is to neutralise this group. The infiltrated policeman is going to find himself in the centre of a large number of problems that Raja faces both on his personal and professional front while his absence too causes trouble for his own persona life.

How Selvam manages to solve Raja's problems while capturing the gang at the cost of his own personal life is the rest of the story as he lives up to the title, someone who works for welfare of others.

Cast 
 M. G. Ramachandran as Selvam and Raja
 Vanisri as Maliga
 Vennira Aadai Nirmala as Kanchana
 M. N. Rajam as Maliga's mother
 Kumari Padmini as Kumudha and Rita, alias Radha
 Baby Rajkumari as Rani, Raja's daughter
 Thengaï Sinivasan as Pandhuragan James Bond, Selvam's assistant
 V. Gopalakrishnan as Police inspector
 P. S. Veerappa as Nagappan
 K. Kannan as Raja Velu, Maliga's father
 M. B. Shetty as A hired man
 Shanmugasundari as Slum people
 Karikol Raju

Production 
Oorukku Uzhaippavan was shot in Karnataka in places such as Mysore and Bangalore.

Soundtrack 
The music was composed by M. S. Viswanathan.

Reception
Kanthan of Kalki praised the cast, songs and cinematography.

References

External links 
 

1970s Tamil-language films
1976 films
Fictional portrayals of the Tamil Nadu Police
Films directed by M. Krishnan Nair
Films scored by M. S. Viswanathan
Tamil remakes of Kannada films